George Warren Philbrook (October 10, 1884 – March 25, 1964) was an American football player and coach, track and field athlete and coach, and college athletics administrator. He competed at the 1912 Summer Olympics, where failed to complete his decathlon program, and finished fifth in the shot put and seventh in the discus throw. Philbrook played college football at the University of Notre Dame. His roommate at Notre Dame in 1909 was Knute Rockne. He served as the head football coach at Whittier College from 1927 to 1928 at and the University of Nevada, Reno from 1929 to 1931.

Philbrook died on March 25, 1964, at the age of 79, at his home in Vancouver, Washington.

Head coaching record

Football

References

External links
 

1884 births
1964 deaths
American football tackles
American male decathletes
American male discus throwers
American male shot putters
Athletes (track and field) at the 1912 Summer Olympics
College track and field coaches in the United States
Nevada Wolf Pack football coaches
Notre Dame Fighting Irish football players
Notre Dame Fighting Irish men's track and field athletes
Olympic decathletes
Olympic track and field athletes of the United States
People from Sierra County, California
Players of American football from California
Portland Pilots athletic directors
Portland Pilots football coaches
Sportspeople from Vancouver, Washington
Whittier Poets football coaches